Thomas Bernard Croat (born 23 May 1938 in St. Marys, Iowa) is an American botanist and plant collector, noteworthy as one of botanical history's "most prolific plant collectors". He has collected over 85,000 species of plants, particularly in the family Araceae, in his career at the Missouri Botanical Garden.

Biography
After serving for about two years in 1956–1958 as a radar technician in the U.S. Army, Croat matriculated at Simpson College, where he graduated in 1962 with a B.A., majoring in botany and minoring in chemistry. He then matriculated at the University of Kansas, where he graduated in 1967 with a Ph.D. in botany. His thesis is entitled "The genus Solidago of the north central Great Plains".

At the Missouri Botanical Garden, Croat was from 1967 to 1971 an assistant botanist, from 1971 to 1976 a curator of phanerogams, from 1976 to 1977 and an associate curator. There he is since 1977 the P. A. Schulze Curator of Botany. From 1967 to 1971 he studied the flora of Panama with the sponsorship of the Missouri Botanical Garden and the Smithsonian Tropical Research Institute. From 1970 to 1971 he was a curator at the Summit Herbarium and Library in the Canal Zone. He has held adjunct faculty appointments at Washington University in St. Louis, at the University of Missouri–St. Louis, and at Saint Louis University.

Croat has collected botanical specimens in 39 different countries. He is a leading expert on aroids of the Neotropics.

In 1965 he married Patricia Swope. They have two children.

Selected publications

Articles

Books

References

External links
 
 
 

1938 births
Living people
20th-century American botanists
21st-century American botanists
Plant collectors
Simpson College alumni
University of Kansas alumni
People from Warren County, Iowa
Missouri Botanical Garden people
Washington University in St. Louis faculty
University of Missouri–St. Louis faculty
Saint Louis University faculty